Randy C. Stoll (born 1945 in Seattle, Washington) was an American basketball player.

Stoll played college basketball at Washington State University. While at Washington State, Stoll was leading the Cougars in scoring in his sophomore season before becoming academically ineligible at mid-season and sitting out the 1965–66 season. He played the 1966–67 season as a redshirt junior, averaging 11 points and 6.3 rebounds per game. Following the season, he chose to leave school for professional basketball.

A 6'7" power forward, Stoll played for the Anaheim Amigos during the 1967-68 American Basketball Association season.  He averaged 5.7 points per game.

References

External links
College stats @ basketball-reference.com

1945 births
Living people
American men's basketball players
Anaheim Amigos players
Basketball players from Seattle
Power forwards (basketball)
Washington State Cougars men's basketball players